Ponderia is a genus of sea snails, marine gastropod mollusks in the subfamily Muricinae of the family Muricidae, the murex snails or rock snails.

Species
Species within the genus Ponderia include:
 † Ponderia abessensis Lozouet, 1998 
 Ponderia abies Houart, 1986
 † Ponderia bispinosa (J. de C. Sowerby, 1823) 
 Ponderia caledonica Houart, 1988
 Ponderia canalifera (Sowerby, 1841)
 Ponderia elephantina Houart, 1990
 Ponderia magna Houart, 1988
 † Ponderia magnei (Vergneau-Saubade, 1968) 
 Ponderia zealandica (Hutton, 1873)

References

 Merle D., Garrigues B. & Pointier J.-P. (2011) Fossil and Recent Muricidae of the world. Part Muricinae. Hackenheim: Conchbooks. 648 pp.

External links
 Houart, R. (1986). Ponderia gen. nov. with discussion of related genera, and description of Ponderia abies sp. nov. (Gastropoda: Muricidae: Muricinae). Apex. 1(3): 88-94.

Muricidae